The seventh season of the animated series WordGirl was originally broadcast on PBS in the United States, beginning on August 4, 2014 and finished broadcast on July 29, 2015. The seventh season contained 13 episodes (26 11-minute segments).

Episodes 
{| class="wikitable plainrowheaders" style="width:100%; margin:auto; background:#FFFFFF;"
|-
! scope=col style="background-color: #B0C4DE; color:#000; text-align: center;" width=20|No. inseries
! scope=col style="background-color: #B0C4DE; color:#000; text-align: center;" width=20|No. inseason
! scope=col style="background-color: #B0C4DE; color:#000; text-align: center;" |Title
! scope=col style="background-color: #B0C4DE; color:#000; text-align: center;" |Written by
! scope=col style="background-color: #B0C4DE; color:#000; text-align: center;" width=30|Original airdate
! scope=col style="background-color: #B0C4DE; color:#000; text-align: center;" width=20|Productioncode
|-

|}

References

2014 American television seasons
2015 American television seasons
WordGirl seasons